The  opened in Kyōto, Japan, in 2001. It exhibits materials from the collection of some 2,600,000 objects built up by Kyoto University since its foundation as Kyoto Imperial University in 1897. Arranged in accordance with three main themes - natural, cultural, and technological history - the collection includes artefacts excavated from the Yamashina  that have been designated a National Treasure, several Important Cultural Properties, and materials from a number of excavations in China and Korea. The museum is part of the University Museum Association of Kyoto, a network of fourteen university museums in the city.

See also
 List of National Treasures of Japan (archaeological materials)
 Kyoto National Museum
 Ōtani University Museum
 Ryūkoku Museum
 Doshisha University Historical Museum
 Bukkyō University Museum of Religious Culture
 Kyoto Museum for World Peace

References

External links

 Kyoto University Museum

Museums in Kyoto
Museums established in 2001
2001 establishments in Japan
University museums in Japan